Monte Bregagno is a mountain of Lombardy, Italy, It has an elevation of 2,107 metres.

SOIUSA classification 

According to the SOIUSA (International Standardized Mountain Subdivision of the Alps) the mountain can be classified in the following way:
 main part = Western Alps
 major sector = North Western Alps
 section = Lugano Prealps
 subsection = Prealpi Comasche
 supergroup = Catena Gino-Camoghè-Fiorina
 group = Gruppo del Gino
 code = I/B-11.I-A.1

Notes

Mountains of the Alps
Mountains of Lombardy
Two-thousanders of Italy
Lugano Prealps